This is the list of best-selling albums in Portugal.

Notes

References

Portugal